Plantactinospora is a genus in the phylum Actinomycetota (Bacteria).

See also 
 Microbiology

References 

Bacteria genera
Micromonosporaceae